Pedro Lugo may refer to:
Pedro Lugo "El Nene" (b. 1960), Cuban singer
Pedro Lugo (athlete), Mexican runner at the 1930 Central American and Caribbean Games
Pedro Fernández de Lugo (1475–1536), Spanish nobleman